The Strongman Super Series, known from 2001 to 2004 as the IFSA World Strongman Super Series, from 2005 to 2008 as the World's Strongest Man Super Series, and reverting in 2009 to the World Strongman Super Series, is a sequence of grand prix events in the sport of strength athletics. It was introduced in 2001 in response to concerns that, unlike other individual sports such as golf or tennis, there was no recognized international "tour" in strength athletics. The Strongman Super Series ensures that there are a number of high-profile, professionally run contests during the year, with competitors' placings being used to decide the overall Super Series Champion.

Typically, ten to twelve athletes take part in each GP, comprising the top six in the international rankings and at least four qualifiers or wildcard entries. The winner of each grand prix receives ten series points, the second placed, nine, and so on. The highest scoring competitor at the end of the series is named World Champion.

World Class Events ("WCE") ran the Super Series in co-operation with the International Federation of Strength Athletes ("IFSA") from 2001 to 2004 until IFSA cut ties with WCE and World's Strongest Man and began promoting their own grand prix events and world championships. In 2005, WCE signed a deal with Trans World International ("TWI"), the world's largest independent producer and distributor of sports programming, to have the exclusive rights worldwide to be the only qualifying tour to the MET-Rx World's Strongest Man event for 2005–2008. The top four athletes from each Grand Prix competition receive an automatic invitation to WSM.

On April 27, 2009 Giants Live, an arena-based series of live strongman competitions, was named the Official World's Strongest Man Qualifying Tour for 2009–2011, thus taking over from the Strongman Super Series in this regard. The first 2009 qualifying event took place on May 17 at the Mohegan Sun Casino in Uncasville, Connecticut, and the second event being the Viking Power competition in Norway, and finishing off the 2009 season in Poland.

Super Series World Champions

*

2001

The International Federation of Strength Athletes co-produced the Strongman Super Series events from 2001 to 2004 along with World Class Events (WCE)/Ulf Bengtsson.

2002

2003/04

2004

2005
Beginning in 2005, WSM/WCE cut all ties with IFSA, who had begun promoting their own separate grand prix events and world championships. The Strongman Super Series then became known as the World's Strongest Man Super Series and was the official qualifying tour for World's Strongest Man from 2005 to 2008.

2006

2007

2008

2009
Giants Live replaced the World's Strongest Man Super Series beginning in 2009 as the official qualifying tour for the World's Strongest Man. However, Strongman Super Series continued to hold events under the new title of World Strongman Super Series in 2009 & 2010.

Events from 2001 to 2006 from Archive of www.super-series.com

2010

See also 
List of strongman competitions
International Federation of Strength Athletes
World's Strongest Man
Giants Live
Arnold Strongman Classic
World Muscle Power Championships

References

External links
WSM Super Series Official website to 2008
World Strongman Super Series Official website from 2009

Strongmen competitions